W30CV-D, virtual and UHF digital channel 30, branded on-air as WHHI-TV, is a low-powered, Class A independent television station licensed to Hilton Head Island, South Carolina. The station is carried on area cable systems operated by Hargray Channel(s) 8 and 418 and Spectrum channel(s) 3 and 1230. as well as IPTV services DirecTV Stream (Formerly AT&T TV), Hulu Live, Sling and YouTube TV.

WHHI-TV is one of two TV stations owned and operated by Byrne Acquisition Group, LLC (Ion affiliate WIFS in Madison, Wisconsin is the other). WHHI-TV is the only local broadcast station in southeastern South Carolina, serving over 70,000 households in the region, including the counties of Beaufort, Jasper, and Hampton.

Programming
The WHHI-TV schedule almost exclusively consists of locally produced news, sports, and entertainment programs, including the following:

843TV — A panel discussion of community issues, businesses, and events.  Filmed at different locations throughout the Hilton Head Island, Bluffton, and Beaufort areas.

Beaufort News — Hosted by Daniella Squicquero.  A weekly news broadcast focusing on local events and noteworthy news items in the Beaufort, SC area.  Includes headlines and interviews with local newsmakers.

Bluffton News — Hosted by Betsy McDaniel.  A weekly news broadcast focusing on local events and noteworthy news items in the Bluffton, SC area.  Includes headlines and interviews with local newsmakers.

Coligny Corner — Hosted by Leslie Richardson and Heather Rath.  A show presented by Coligny Plaza promoting businesses in the Coligny Plaza area.

Girl Talk — A female panel discussion consisting of a wide array of topics including style, fashion, health, fitness, business/event promotion, and more.

Healthy Living — Hosted by Debi Lynes.  Talk show discussing health and medicine.

High School Basketball — Local High School Basketball Game of the Week aired in its entirety.  Five games each season.

High School Football — Local High School Football Game of the Week aired in its entirety.  Games are covered over the course of an 11-week season.

Hilton Head News — Hosted by Bob Stevens.  Formerly known as The Lowcountry Report, this news broadcast focuses on local events and noteworthy news items on Hilton Head Island.  Follows the same general outline as Bluffton News and Beaufort News, with frequent on-location coverage at notable community events.

Lynes on Design — Hosted by Debi Lynes.  Focuses on interior decorating, home decor, outdoor living, etc.

North of the Broad — Hosted by Kathryn Mademann.  Talk show interviewing a wide array of local business owners, event coordinators, etc.  Focuses primarily on businesses north of the Broad River, or northern Beaufort County.  This includes Beaufort, Port Royal, and surrounding areas.

Real Estate in the Lowcountry — Hosted by Betsy McDaniel.  Along with headlines, this showcases realtors in the Lowcountry area as well as updates the community on the status of the local real estate market.

Senior Network — Hosted by Gregg Fulton.  A panel discussion covering topics related to senior care and living.

Talk of the Town — Talk show interviewing a wide array of local business owners, politicians, event coordinators, etc. who promote their business or upcoming event.

Timeless Interiors — Hosted by Holly Dixon.  Showcases homes on-location that have been furnished and/or renovated.

Wedgeworth Update — Hosted by Ally McNair.  A discussion with James Wedgeworth, local realtor, on the current state of the local real estate market.

What's Cooking in the Lowcountry — This program showcases local restaurants in the area, their menu items, recipes, and cooking tips.

References

External links
Official site

30CV-D
Low-power television stations in the United States
Television channels and stations established in 1992